The capital resources, performance and scalability (CPS) model is a set of case analysis frameworks recommended by the Global Alliance for Strategy in collaboration with European School of Management and Technology and is widely used for assessing the sustainability and competitive ability of an organization.

Versions 

The CPS model has several published versions, the latest revision being the one developed by Dr. P. V. Lele in August 2006.

Frameworks 
The CPS model, in its most popular version, has five frameworks:
 MAN-CHA
 BOSH value
 SAC score
 EMPT score
 Y.U.K.U. Score
 Differential derivation value (DVD) index
 tri-VIN framework
 Technology polarization at normal purchasing power

Applications and criticism 

CPS has been very useful in consumer durables and fast-moving consumer goods industries. However, the model fails to be effective in manufacturing industry. 
In several emerging businesses such as software services and business process outsourcing, the DVD index returns a negative value, making the model redundant.

Notes

References 

 Competition Analysis, ESMT, http://www.esmt.org/eng/consulting/esmt-competition-analysis/
 Robert E. Gunther, Hubert Gatignon, John R. Kimberly, The INSEAD-Wharton Alliance on Globalizing: Strategies for Building Successful Global Businesses, 

Management systems